David Farrington may refer to:
David Farrington Park, a football ground in Wellington, New Zealand
David P. Farrington (born 1944), British criminologist